Gary Inskeep (born March 31, 1947) is a former Canadian football player who played with the Toronto Argonauts and Hamilton Tiger-Cats. He won the Grey Cup with Hamilton in 1972. Inskeep played college football at the University of Wisconsin-Stout.

References

1947 births
Living people
American players of Canadian football
Hamilton Tiger-Cats players
People from Lonaconing, Maryland
Players of American football from Maryland
Toronto Argonauts players
Wisconsin–Stout Blue Devils football players